Egelsee is a lake at Bergdietikon, Aargau, Switzerland. It is the largest natural lake that lies entirely in the canton (the much larger Lake Hallwil lies partly in canton Lucerne).

External links

Lakes of Switzerland
Lakes of Aargau
LEgelsee